Viel Lärm um nichts  is an East German film based on William Shakespeare's play Much Ado About Nothing. It was released in 1964.

Cast
 Christel Bodenstein: Beatrice
 Rolf Ludwig: Benedikt
 Wilfried Ortmann: Don Pedro
 Martin Flörchinger: Leonato
 Gerhard Rachold: Don Juan
 Arno Wyzniewski: Claudio
 Ursula Körbs: Hero
 Carl Balhaus: Antonio
 Ingrid Michalk: Margareta
 Heidi Ortner: Ursula
 Ekkehard Hahn: Balthasar
 Edwin Marian: Borachio
 Gerhard Bienert: Holzapfel
 Rudolf Ulrich: Schleewein
 Fred Delmare: Wachsoldat Haberkuchen

External links
 

1964 films
East German films
1960s German-language films
German films based on plays
Films based on Much Ado About Nothing
1960s German films